The Hits Album 7 or Hits 7 is a compilation album that was released in November 1987 by CBS, BMG, and WEA. It reached #2 in the UK Albums Chart (held off by Now 10, another compilation). This was the 10th best selling album of 1987 and was the first in the Hits series to be released on double-CD. It contained 32 tracks, 15 of which appeared on the VHS collection, The Hits Video 7.

Hits 7 includes two songs which reached number one on the UK Singles Chart: "You Win Again" and "Never Gonna Give You Up".

Track listing
(Cat No: CD HITS 7)

CD/record/tape 1
Bee Gees - "You Win Again"
Rick Astley - "Never Gonna Give You Up"
Terence Trent D'Arby - "Wishing Well"
Five Star - "Strong as Steel"
Spagna - "Call Me"
Beastie Boys - "She's on It"
Abigail Mead & Nigel Goulding - "Full Metal Jacket (I Want To Be Your Drill Instructor)"
Shakin' Stevens - "What Do You Want to Make Those Eyes at Me For?"
Fleetwood Mac - "Little Lies"
Alexander O'Neal - "Criticize (Radio Edit)"
Prince - "U Got the Look"
Donna Summer - "Dinner with Gershwin"
LeVert - "Casanova"
Pseudo Echo - "Funkytown"
Eric B. & Rakim - "Paid in Full"
Chic - "Jack Le Freak (Edit)"

CD/record/tape 2
A-ha - "The Living Daylights"
Wax - "Bridge to Your Heart"
Scarlet Fantastic - "No Memory"
The Jesus and Mary Chain - "Darklands"
The Sisters of Mercy - "This Corrosion"
House Master Boyz & The Rude Boy Of The House - "House Nation"
Desireless - "Voyage, voyage"
Nina Simone - "My Baby Just Cares for Me"
Bill Medley and Jennifer Warnes - "(I've Had) The Time of My Life" (Theme from Dirty Dancing)
Atlantic Starr - "Always"
Luther Vandross - "So Amazing"
Whitney Houston - "Didn't We Almost Have It All"
Ray Parker Jr. - "I Don't Think That Man Should Sleep Alone"
LL Cool J - "I Need Love"
Kenny G - "Songbird"
Simply Red - "Ev'ry Time We Say Goodbye"

Video selection - The Hits Video 7
Rick Astley - "Never Gonna Give You Up"
Terence Trent D'Arby - "Wishing Well"
Five Star - "Strong as Steel"
Spagna - "Call Me"
Alexander O'Neal - "Criticize (Radio Edit)"
Shakin' Stevens - "What Do You Want to Make Those Eyes at Me For?"
Eric B. & Rakim - "Paid in Full"
LL Cool J - "I Need Love"
Wax - "Bridge to Your Heart"
Scarlet Fantastic - "No Memory"
The Jesus & Mary Chain - "Darklands"
The Sisters of Mercy - "This Corrosion"
Desireless - "Voyage, voyage"
Nina Simone - "My Baby Just Cares for Me"
Simply Red - "Ev'ry Time We Say Goodbye"

References
 Graham Betts, Collins Complete UK Hit Albums 1956-2005. Collins, 2005. .

1987 compilation albums
Pop compilation albums
CBS Records compilation albums
Warner Music Group compilation albums
Hits (compilation series) albums